Henderson Township may refer to:

Arkansas
 Henderson Township, Hot Spring County, Arkansas, in Hot Spring County, Arkansas
 Henderson Township, Union County, Arkansas, in Union County, Arkansas

Illinois
 Henderson Township, Knox County, Illinois

Michigan
 Henderson Township, Michigan

Minnesota
 Henderson Township, Sibley County, Minnesota

North Carolina
 Henderson Township, Vance County, North Carolina, in Vance County, North Carolina

North Dakota
 Henderson Township, Cavalier County, North Dakota, in Cavalier County, North Dakota

Pennsylvania
 Henderson Township, Huntingdon County, Pennsylvania
 Henderson Township, Jefferson County, Pennsylvania

Township name disambiguation pages